AIK suffered from a season of turmoil, starting with high-profile loan signing Sebastián Eguren being a flop, continuing with the resignation of 2009 double-winning coach Mikael Stahre and the reigning champions getting involved in a relegation scrap. A disappointing display in Europe, getting knocked out of both the Champions League and the Europa League early was followed by a decent autumn, which at least saved the contract, much thanks to IFK Värnamo recruit Mohamed Bangura proving to be a success.

Season events
At the start of January, AIK sold Jos Hooiveld to Celtic for £2,000,000.

In February, Sebastián Eguren joined AIK from Villarreal.

In March, goalkeeper Kyriakos Stamatopoulos joined on loan for the season from Tromsø. Whilst Yussuf Saleh joined Syrianska in a similar deal.

The following month, April, Clécio joined on loan from Morrinhos until 30 June.

In May, AIK announced that they had taken Ivan Turina and Jerry Bengtson on trial.

On 4 June, Miran Burgić left AIK to sign for Wacker Innsbruck, whilst on 17 June, Jorge Ortiz returned to Arsenal de Sarandí.

At the end of June, AIK signed Helgi Daníelsson, Robert Persson, Goran Ljubojević and Admir Ćatović whilst Bojan Djordjic and Martin Kayongo-Mutumba both left the club to sign for Videoton in Hungary. Mohamed Bangura joined in Mid-July from Kallon.

At the end of August, Kevin Walker joined Assyriska on loan until 30 October.

On 3 December, AIK announced that both Nicklas Bergh and Saihou Jagne would be leaving the club when their contracts expired at the end of the season.

Squad

Transfers

In

Loans in

Out

Loans out

Released

Trial

Competitions

Overview

Svenska Supercupen

Allsvenskan

League table

Results summary

Results by matchday

Results

Svenska Cupen

UEFA Champions League

Qualifying rounds

UEFA Europa League

Playoff round

Squad statistics

Appearances and goals

|-
|colspan="16"|Players away on loan:
|-
|colspan="16"|Players who appeared for AIK but left during the season:

|}

Goal scorers

Clean sheets

Disciplinary record

References

Sources
   AIK Fotboll – Soccerway.com

AIK Fotboll seasons
AIK